Friedrich Lorentz (18 December 1870, Güstrow – 29 March 1937) was a German historian. He is the author of publications in the field of linguistics, as well as Kashubian and Slovincian culture. As he wrote, Kashubian is a language having 76 different subdialects.

Works
 Slovinzische Texte S.-Peterburg : Izdanìe Vtorogo Otdělenìâ Imperatorskoj Akademìi Nauk, 1905.
 Kaszubi: kultura ludowa i język, translated as The Cassubian Civilization by Friedrich Lorentz and A. Fischer with Tadeusz Lehr-Spławiński, London, Faber and Faber, 1935.

References  
 G. Stone Slav Outposts in Central European History: the Wends, Sorbs and Kashubs. London: Bloomsbury Academic, 2016, p. 286

1870 births
1937 deaths
People from Güstrow
People from the Grand Duchy of Mecklenburg-Schwerin
20th-century German historians
German male non-fiction writers
Corresponding Members of the USSR Academy of Sciences